The 2016 Garden Open was a professional tennis tournament played on clay courts. It was the eighth edition of the tournament which was part of the 2016 ATP Challenger Tour. It took place in Rome, Italy between 2 and 7 May 2016.

Singles main-draw entrants

Seeds

 1 Rankings as of April 25, 2016.

Other entrants
The following players received wildcards into the singles main draw:
  Federico Bonacia
  Flavio Cipolla
  Andrea Pellegrino
  Gianluca Naso

The following players received entry into the singles main draw: as a special exempt:
  Stefano Napolitano

The following players received entry into the main draw with  a protected ranking:
  Julian Reister

The following players received entry from the qualifying draw:
  Frederico Ferreira Silva
  Ivan Nedelko
  Sumit Nagal
  Márton Fucsovics

The following players entered the main draw as lucky losers:
  Kevin Krawietz
  Yasutaka Uchiyama

Champions

Singles

  Kyle Edmund def.  Filip Krajinović, 7–6(7–2), 6–0

Doubles

  Bai Yan /  Li Zhe def.  Sander Arends /  Tristan-Samuel Weissborn, 6–3, 3–6, [11–9]

External links
Official Website

Garden Open
Garden Open
Garden